Zameer Khan (born 17 September 1990) is a Danish cricketer. He played for the Denmark national cricket team in the 2016 ICC World Cricket League Division Four tournament in October 2016. In March 2018, he was named in Denmark's squad for the 2018 ICC World Cricket League Division Four tournament in Malaysia.

In September 2018, he was named in Denmark's squad for the 2018 ICC World Cricket League Division Three tournament in Oman. He made his Twenty20 International (T20I) debut for Denmark against Finland in a bilateral series on 13 July 2019.

In August 2019, he was named in Denmark's squad for the 2019 Malaysia Cricket World Cup Challenge League A tournament. He made his List A debut for Denmark, against Malaysia, in the Cricket World Cup Challenge League A tournament on 16 September 2019. In October 2021, he was named in Denmark's T20I squad for the Regional Final of the 2021 ICC Men's T20 World Cup Europe Qualifier tournament.

References

External links
 

1990 births
Living people
Danish cricketers
Denmark Twenty20 International cricketers
Place of birth missing (living people)